Setigui Karamoko (born 10 October 1999) is a French professional footballer who plays as a centre-back for Liga Portugal 2 club Feirense.

Club career
A youth product of Le Puy Foot, Karamoko began his senior career with Béziers in the Championnat National in 2020. He transferred to the reserves of Saint-Étienne on 28 May 2020. He moved to Paris FC in 2021 where was originally assigned to their reserves, before promoting to their senior team for the 2022-23 season.

On 31 January 2023, Karamoko signed with Feirense in Portugal.

Personal life
Born in France, Karamoko is of Ivorian descent.

Playing style
Karamoko is a tall, athletic and brave left- footed centre-back. He has good pace and can play a physical style. For his syize, he is a good ball handler. He is also capable of scoring goals, having scored on an impressive run from 80m when he was in the Championnat National.

References

External links
 
 

1999 births
Living people
Footballers from Paris
French footballers
French sportspeople of Ivorian descent
Association football defenders
AS Béziers (2007) players
AS Saint-Étienne players
Paris FC players
C.D. Feirense players
Ligue 2 players
Championnat National players
Championnat National 3 players
French expatriate footballers
Expatriate footballers in Portugal
French expatriate sportspeople in Portugal